Statistics of the Mexican Primera División for the 1974–75 season.

Overview

UANL was promoted to Primera División.

Segunda División semifinalists, UASLP-Pumas (who re-branded to Atlético Potosino) and Unión de Curtidores were promoted to the Primera División to increase the number of teams to 20.

UdeG acquired Torreón franchise.

This season was contested by 20 teams, and Toluca won the championship.

Ciudad Madero was relegated to Segunda División.

Teams

Group stage

Group 1

Group 2

Results

Championship Group Stage Final

Championship Group Stage results

Round 1

Round 2

Round 3

Round 4

Round 5

Round 6

References
Mexico - List of final tables (RSSSF)

Liga MX seasons
Mex
1974–75 in Mexican football